Theodore I Palaiologos (or Palaeologus) (c. 1355 – 24 June 1407) was despot (despotēs) in the Morea from 1383 until his death on 24 June 1407. A son of Emperor John V Palaiologos, Theodore was the first member of the Palaiologos dynasty appointed as the Despot of the Morea, following the final defeat of the rival Kantakouzenos clan, who under John VI Kantakouzenos had attempted to usurp rule of the Byzantine Empire.

Theodore conducted several military campaigns to expand his province, successfully annexing several Latin possessions that remained there since the aftermath of the Fourth Crusade. He died without known heirs and was succeeded as Despot of the Morea by Theodore II, a son of Emperor Manuel II Palaiologos.

Biography 
Theodore was the youngest surviving son of the Byzantine Emperor John V Palaiologos and his wife Helena Kantakouzene. His maternal grandfather was former Emperor John VI Kantakouzenos. His older brothers were Emperor Andronikos IV Palaiologos and Manuel II Palaiologos.

In 1376 Theodore I Palaiologos, already named despotēs, was charged with governing Thessalonica by his father John V, but before he could take possession of the city, he was arrested and imprisoned together with his father and his brother Manuel by his eldest brother Andronikos IV. This captivity in the Prison of Anemas in Constantinople lasted throughout Andronikos' usurpation, from 1376 until 1379. Soon after the restoration of John V, Manuel was appointed to rule in Thessalonica, and Theodore was eventually transferred to Morea.

The Morea had remained in the hands of Manuel Kantakouzenos, a younger son of Emperor John VI, even after the latter's abdication in 1354. Manuel died in 1380 and was succeeded by his older brother, the former co-emperor Matthew Kantakouzenos, who died or retired in 1383. By this time Theodore was appointed to rule the Morea (in 1382), but Matthew was briefly succeeded by his son perhaps Demetrios I Kantakouzenos. Theodore I Palaiologos arrived in the Morea in 1383 and successfully took possession of the province.

The young despotēs soon commenced wars for the expansion of his province. His military campaigns were arguably the most successful Byzantine military operations since the annexation of large regions of Thessaly and Epirus by his paternal grandfather Andronikos III Palaiologos earlier in the 14th century. In order to increase the potential manpower of his army, Theodore encouraged the settlement of Albanians in Morea, and recruited them as troops against local landowners, the Latin possessions surrounding his province, and against the encroaching Ottomans.

Theodore's first successes came in 1388, soon followed by his conquest of Argos. However the Republic of Venice intervened and took control of Argos from him while also offering protection to Patras. The situation was resolved with the signing of a military alliance between Morea and Venice in 1394. Bayezid I of the Ottoman Empire was starting to expand his control over the Balkans and both rivals for control over the Peloponnese had to defend it against a possible invasion by the Ottomans. The new alliance was accompanied by a decision to build a fortification wall across the Isthmus of Corinth.

The military genius of Theodore would soon become evident. Not only did he defeat invading Ottoman forces but successfully counter-attacked and conquered both Corinth (1395) and Athens (1396). His victories attracted the attention of Bayezid I who started considering him a dangerous opponent. Bayezid personally led a full military invasion against the Morea.

Unlike his older brother Manuel II, Theodore refused to submit to Bayezid, and continued to fight till the end. When he was no longer able to prevent Mystras and Corinth from falling to Ottoman control, Theodore instead offered both cities (Corinth in 1397, Mystras in 1400) to the Knights Hospitaller of Rhodes. This ensured their continued resistance to the Ottomans even when not under his own control.

In the end his methods proved successful. Bayezid I declared the Peloponnese an Ottoman province but failed to fully establish his control before calling off his campaign and returning to his capital in Edirne. Theodore soon managed to restore his control in Morea and most of his former conquests. The Knights Hospitaller even returned to him Mystras and Corinth in 1404, when their forces were no longer needed to secure the area.

In 1400, Bayezid I had turned his attention to Constantinople and was besieging the city. Manuel II managed to escape his capital along with most of the Imperial family. He set out in person to seek help from the forces of Western Europe. Meanwhile, he left his family in the protection of Theodore. Theodore secured his visiting kin in his new provincial capital in Monemvasia.

Theodore I had married Bartolomea Acciaioli, a daughter of Duke Nerio I Acciaioli of Athens but is not known to have sons. Shortly before his death, Theodore took monastic orders under the name "Theodoret", and died on 24 June 1407. He was subsequently buried at the Brontochion Monastery. The succession problem caused by his death was resolved when Manuel II named his own underage son Theodore II Palaiologos as the new despotēs of the Morea.

Some sources consider an unnamed daughter of Theodore to be the wife of Süleyman Çelebi, the Edirne Sultan during the Ottoman Interregnum. There are no known descendants of Suleyman.

References

Sources
 
 

Joseph Freiherr von Hammer-Purgstall, Geschichte des Osmanischen Reiches
Edward Gibbon, The History of the Decline and Fall of the Roman Empire
George Sphrantzes, The Fall of the Byzantine Empire

1355 births
1407 deaths
14th-century Despots of the Morea
15th-century Despots of the Morea
Palaiologos dynasty
Despots of the Morea
Byzantine prisoners and detainees
Sons of Byzantine emperors